Joseph of Jerusalem may refer to 
Joseph I of Jerusalem
Joseph II of Jerusalem